Paraglenea cinereonigra is a species of beetle in the family Cerambycidae. It was described by Pesarini and Sabbadini in 1996. It is known from China.

References

Saperdini
Beetles described in 1996